Ragalna is a comune (municipality) in the Metropolitan City of Catania in the Italian region Sicily, located about  southeast of Palermo and about  northwest of Catania.

Points of interest include the Giardino Botanico "Nuova Gussonea", a botanical garden on Mount Etna.

References

Cities and towns in Sicily